Peter Young is a set decorator. He has won two Academy Awards in the category Best Art Direction for the films Batman and Sleepy Hollow.

Selected filmography
 Batman (1989)
 Sleepy Hollow (1999)

References

External links

Year of birth missing (living people)
Living people
Set decorators
Best Art Direction Academy Award winners
Place of birth missing (living people)